Frederic Henry de Winton MA (1852–1932) was an Anglican clergyman and the last Missionary Fellow of Jesus College, Oxford. De Winton was Archdeacon of Colombo from 1891 until 1901.

Born on 19 January 1852 into an ecclesiastical family, he was educated at Uppingham School and Balliol College, Oxford.

He was elected to a Leoline Fellowship at Jesus College, Oxford in 1876. This category of fellow at Jesus College was established by Leoline Jenkins, a former principal of the college, to provide priests to serve in "His Majesty's fleet at sea and foreign plantations", under the direction of the Lord High Admiral and the Bishop of London respectively. De Winton was the last of these fellows, since they were abolished in 1877 by the Oxford and Cambridge Universities Commission without prejudice to the rights of existing holders. He held the position until his death, by which time he had become the most senior fellow at the college.

He was made deacon at Oxford on 24 September 1876.

In 1877 he went to Ceylon as chaplain  to the Bishop of Colombo. He held various parochial charges in Ceylon including Diocesan Inspector of Schools followed by incumbencies at St Mark, Badulla then St John, Kalutara  until his appointment as Archdeacon in 1902. He held this position until 1925. Alfred Hazel, Principal of the college at the time of de Winton's death, said that he had devoted his life to Colombo, where he was a "well-known and well-loved, if rather eccentric, figure". He retired to England and died in Bognor Regis on 25 April 1932.

Notes and references

 
 "The Clergy List, Clerical Guide and Ecclesiastical Directory" London, John Phillips, 1900
 
 
 Crockford's Clerical Directory, 1908, p. 397
 
 The Rev. F. H. De Winton The Times (London, England), Friday, 29 April 1932; p. 19; issue 46120

Sri Lankan Anglican priests
Anglican chaplains
People educated at Uppingham School
Alumni of University College, Oxford
Fellows of Jesus College, Oxford
Archdeacons of Colombo
1852 births
1932 deaths
Alumni of Balliol College, Oxford
People from British Ceylon
19th-century Anglican priests
20th-century Anglican priests